Winchester Short Magnum, or WSM, refers to a family of rebated rim bottlenecked centerfire short magnum cartridges developed in the early 2000s by the U.S. Repeating Arms Company, the maker of Winchester rifles and one of the oldest firearms manufacturers in the United States. All of the WSM cartridges are inspired on the .404 Jeffery non-belted magnum cartridge which is shortened to fit a short rifle action (such as a .308 Winchester).

It was developed by Rick Jamison in 1997-1998 as proven in a 2005 lawsuit Jamison vs. Olin Corporation-Winchester division. Jamison was given 7 patents on the cartridge design. U.S. Repeating Arms Company used the same concept and the same base case in creating its even shorter Winchester Super Short Magnum cartridges, three of which were introduced in 2003 and 2004.

Influences

7.82 Lazzeroni Patriot
The WSM family was inspired partially by a family of proprietary short magnum cartridges developed in late 1997, by John Lazzeroni, derived from a previous line of magnum cartridges he had created. The first Lazzeroni short magnum, the 7.82 Lazzeroni Patriot, was designed to operate in a short-action rifle, instead of requiring a long action. The U.S. Repeating Arms Company was the first major manufacturer to commercialize Lazzeroni's concept, followed shortly thereafter by Remington with their "Short Action Ultra Mag" line.

6 mm Benchrest
Another influence was a series of 6 mm cartridges developed for bench-rest target shooting competitions in the 1970s. The idea behind these cartridges was that a short, fat cartridge would be more "efficient" than the traditional long, narrow cartridge, as more of the powder column would be in the immediate vicinity of the primer as it detonated. In turn, this would mean that a cartridge of this type would be able to propel a bullet at speeds comparable to those of "magnum" cartridges of the same caliber using significantly less powder.

Dimensions
The dimensions of the basic case are:
 Rim diameter (at base): .535 in. (13.59 mm)
 Outside diameter (at base): .555 in. (14.10 mm)
 Inside diameter (of case): .538 in. (13.67 mm)
 Maximum case length: 2.10 in. (53.34 mm)

The WSM family of cartridges are Delta L problem cartridges, meaning they can present unexpected chambering and/or feeding problems.

Variants
The 300 WSM was the first of the new class of short magnums to see wide use. All of the WSM cartridges released to date have proven popular for thin-skinned game up to the size of elk and African plains game, the .325 WSM being an excellent cartridge for elk, bison and similar big game.

The cartridges in this family are, in order of development:

See also
 List of rifle cartridges
 .300 Remington Short Action Ultra Magnum
 Winchester Super Short Magnum

References

 7mm WSM and 7mm-300 WSM Cartridge Guide by AccurateShooter.com
 WSM and WSSM ballistic Comparison Chart at Browning

Cartridge families
Winchester Repeating Arms Company firearms
Winchester Short Magnum